The Veterans Affairs Council (VAC) is a branch of the Executive Yuan of the Republic of China (Taiwan) with "responsibilities to assist in education assistance, employment assistance, medical care, home care and other general services" for retired servicemen and women from the Republic of China Armed Forces. VAC is a National  Member of World Veterans Federation.

The incumbent minister is Feng Shih-kuan, a retired Republic of China Air Force General who took office on 5 August 2019.

History

VAC was founded as cabinet-level organization on 1 November 1954 as Vocational Assistance Commission for Retired Servicemen (VACRS). It changed name to Veterans Affairs Commission in 1966 and to Veterans Affairs Council on 1 November 2013.

Missions and functions
 Ensuring the Vitality of the Armed Forces
 Securing Social Stability and Prosperity
 Maximizing Human Resources
 Supporting National Reconstruction
 Developing Substantive Diplomacy

Organizational structures
 Department of Planning
 Department of Veterans Service and Assistance
 Department of Homecare and Nursing Care
 Department of Education and Employment Assistance
 Department of Healthcare and Medical Care
 Department of Business Management
 Department of Retirement Payment
 Department of Administrative Management
 Department of Personnel
 Department of Civil Service Ethics
 Department of Accounting
 Department of Statistics and Information
 Legal Affairs Committee

Hospitals and Veterans Homes
VAC operates hospitals and retirement homes, including:
 Taipei Veterans General Hospital
 Kaohsiung Veterans General Hospital

Associated Enterprises

Under its charter to provide employment assistance to Taiwan (ROC) military veterans, the Veterans Affairs Commission operates a number of for profit enterprises in Taiwan that employ veterans.  Some of the related businesses include:
 Shin-Shin Bus Company (欣欣客運)
 Danan Bus Company (大南汽車)
 Wuling Farm
 Fushoushan Farm
 Cingjing Farm
 RSEA Engineering (榮民工程公司) - As on 1 July 1998 no longer associated with the Veterans Affairs Commission.

List of VAC Ministers
Political parties:

For ministers who retired from the Armed Forces to serve, the Service column denotes their military branch before retirement.

See also
 Republic of China Armed Forces

References

External links 
 

1954 establishments in Taiwan
Executive Yuan
Government agencies established in 1954
Veterans' affairs ministries
Veterans' affairs in Taiwan